Pak Yol (1902–1974, born Pak Jun-sik) or Bak Yeol, was a Korean anarchist and independence activist who was convicted of high treason in Japan for conspiring to attack the Imperial House of Japan.

In popular culture
 Portrayed by Lee Je-hoon in the 2017 film Anarchist from Colony.

See also

Amakasu Incident
Toranomon Incident
Assassination attempts on Hirohito

Further reading

External links

Korean independence activists
Korean anarchists
Mindan
1902 births
1974 deaths